Provencher is a surname. Notable people with the surname include:

Jennifer Provencher (born 1979), Canadian conservation biologist
Joseph Provencher (1843–1887), Canadian pioneer, politician, and newspaper editor
Norbert Provencher (1787–1853), Canadian clergyman and missionary